Opinion polling was commissioned throughout the duration of the 45th New Zealand Parliament in the lead up to the 1999 election by various organisations.

Party vote
Polls are listed in the table below in chronological order. Refusals are generally excluded from the party vote percentages, while question wording and the treatment of "don't know" responses and those not intending to vote may vary between survey firms.

Individual polls

Preferred Prime Minister

Individual polls

Electorate polling

Coromandel

Wellington Central

Ikaroa-Rāwhiti

Waiariki

See also
1999 New Zealand general election
Politics of New Zealand

Notes

References

1999
1999 New Zealand general election
New Zealand